Scroll Publishing Company is an academic publisher focusing on early Christianity. It was founded in 1988 as a non-profit publishing house and is located in Amberson, Pennsylvania. It serves, in particular, the Anabaptist community.

The focus of their books is on early Christianity and church history, including the distribution of the Ante-Nicene Fathers in its ten-volume set. Additionally, they sell Christian music cassettes and CDs, postcards and head coverings for women. Notable authors whose works are printed by the Scroll Publishing Company include David Bercot and Peter Hoover.

See also 
 Pathway Publishers

References

Anabaptism